Nasrollah Mardani  one of the famous poets in Iran. He was born in Kazerun in 1947 and died in 2003 in Karbala.

Resources
Nasrollah Mardani
http://www.ibna.ir/vdcjyiex.uqe8az29fu.html

Mardani, Nasrollah
Iranian Science and Culture Hall of Fame recipients in Literature and Culture